National Cycle Route 16, part of the National Cycle Network, connects Bishop's Stortford, Hertfordshire to Southend-on-Sea, Essex.

Route

Bishop's Stortford to Shoeburyness
Bishop Stortford | Little Dunmow | Braintree | Basildon  | Southend on Sea | Shoeburyness

This route is still under development.

See also

details of Braintree to Little Dunmow section

details of Basildon to Shoeburyness section

National Cycle Routes